André Gerhard Wohllebe (9 January 1962 – 29 December 2014) was an East German-German sprint canoeist who competed from the early 1980s to the mid-1990s. Competing in two Summer Olympics, he won three medals with a gold (1992: K-4 1000 m) and two bronzes (1988: K-1 1000 m, K-4 1000 m). He was born in Berlin.

Wohllebe also won eighteen medals at the ICF Canoe Sprint World Championships with eight golds (K-2 500 m: 1983, K-2 1000 m: 1983, K-4 500 m: 1985, 1986, 1991; K-4 1000 m: 1993, K-4 10000 m: 1991, 1993), four silvers (K-2 1000 m: 1986, K-4 500 m: 1990, 1993; K-4 1000 m: 1991), and six bronzes (K-4 200 m: 1995, K-4 500 m: 1981, K-4 1000 m: 1985, 1989, 1990, 1994).

References

André Wohllebe's obituary 

1962 births
2014 deaths
Canoeists at the 1988 Summer Olympics
Canoeists at the 1992 Summer Olympics
German male canoeists
Olympic canoeists of Germany
Olympic canoeists of East Germany
Olympic gold medalists for Germany
Olympic bronze medalists for East Germany
Olympic medalists in canoeing
ICF Canoe Sprint World Championships medalists in kayak
Medalists at the 1992 Summer Olympics
Medalists at the 1988 Summer Olympics